Davidson is an unorganized territory in Polk County, Minnesota, United States. The population was 42 at the 2010 census.

History
Davidson is named for A. D. Davidson, an early prominent landowner.

Geography

Demographics
At the 2000 census there were 57 people, 28 households, and 21 families in the unorganized territory. The population density was 1.8 people per square mile (0.7/km2). There were 54 housing units at an average density of 1.7/sq mi (0.7/km2).  The racial makeup of the unorganized territory was 96.49% White, 1.75% Native American, and 1.75% from two or more races. Hispanic or Latino of any race were 1.75%.

Of the 28 households 25.0% had children under the age of 18 living with them, 53.6% were married couples living together, 14.3% had a female householder with no husband present, and 25.0% were non-families. 21.4% of households were one person and 14.3% were one person aged 65 or older. The average household size was 2.04 and the average family size was 2.29.

The age distribution was 14.0% under the age of 18, 5.3% from 18 to 24, 26.3% from 25 to 44, 36.8% from 45 to 64, and 17.5% 65 or older. The median age was 48 years. For every 100 females, there were 111.1 males. For every 100 females age 18 and over, there were 104.2 males.

The median household income was $23,438 and the median family income  was $30,000. Males had a median income of $36,250 versus $19,375 for females. The per capita income for the unorganized territory was $18,886. There were 8.3% of families and 11.0% of the population living below the poverty line, including 28.6% of under eighteens and 20.0% of those over 64.

References

Populated places in Aitkin County, Minnesota
Unorganized territories in Minnesota